Introduced by William Benoit, image restoration theory (also known as image repair theory) outlines strategies that can be used to restore one's image in an event where reputation has been damaged. Image restoration theory can be applied as an approach for understanding both personal and organizational crisis situations. It is a component of crisis communication, which is a sub-specialty of public relations. Its purpose is to protect an individual, company, or organization facing a public challenge to its reputation.

Benoit outlines this theory in Accounts, Excuses, and Apologies: A Theory of Image Restoration Strategies.

Basic concepts of image restoration theory 

Two components must be present in a given attack to the image of an individual or organization: 
 The accused is held responsible for an action.
 the act is considered offensive.

Image restoration theory is grounded in two fundamental assumptions.

 Communication is a goal-directed activity. Communicators may have multiple goals that are not collectively compatible, but people try to achieve goals that are most important to them at the time, with reasonable cost. 
  Maintaining a favorable reputation is a key goal of communication. Because face, image, or reputation is valued as important, individuals or organizations are motivated to take action when it is compromised.

Perception is fundamental to image restoration, as the accused actor will not engage in a defensive strategy unless the perception exists that he is at fault. The actor who committed the wrongful act must decide on the strategy of the best course based on their specific situation. Factors such as credibility, audience perceptions, and the degree of offensiveness of the act must be taken into account.

Some image repair factors include 

 Crisis responsibility- how much a company or person is responsible for in a crisis
 Crisis type- what type of crisis is happening
 Organizational reputation- what is the known reputation and behavior of a company or a person

Theoretical framework 
The importance of image is one of the key factors in a brand, or persons, business. This is one of the most important factors when it comes to conflict management and resolution. The theory of image restoration builds upon theories of apologia and accounts. Apologia is a formal defense or justification of an individual's opinion, position, or actions, and an account is a statement made by an individual or organization to explain unanticipated or transgressive events.

Benoit claims that these treatments of image restoration focus on identifying options rather than prescribing solutions. He grounds image restoration theory on a comprehensive literature review of apologia and accounts theories.

Specific influences of image restoration theory include Rosenfield's (1968) theory of analog, Ware and Linkugel's (1973) theory of apologia; Kenneth Burke's (1970) theory of goals and purification; Ryan's (1982) kategoria and apologia; Scott and Lyman's (1968) analysis of accounts; Goffman’s (1967) remedial moves; Schonbach's (1980) updated analysis of Scott and Lyman’s (1968) theory; and Schlenker’s (1980) analysis of impression management and accounts.

Typology of image restoration strategies

Case studies

Case studies by Benoit 

Based on several case studies by Benoit and his colleagues, Coombs (2006) cited a number of prescriptive recommendations for the use of crisis strategies (Benoit, 1995; Brinson & Benoit, 1996, 1999). 1) The dominant recommendation is for an organization to immediately admit fault/accept responsibility, 2) Corrective actions should be taken and an organization need to publicize those actions, 3) Bolstering, which is directly related to the charge, is the most effective strategy, and 4) If the organization was innocent, Denial is an effective strategy. “Image restoration theory is the dominant line of research generating these recommendations. The most common recommendations suggest using the mortification and corrective action crisis response when an organization is guilty.” (Coombs, 2006, p. 191)

Here representative case studies by Benoit and his colleagues are introduced.

Limitation of Image repair theory – Coombs 

Even though image restoration theory represented the use of mortification (accepting responsibility) and corrective action, there might be alternative recommendations. For instance, his studies using situational crisis communication theory found no support for always using mortification and corrective action. Also, the mortification and corrective action strategies had no greater effect than a simple bolstering strategy in a criminal violation crisis such as racial discrimination (Coombs, 2006). This theory can not be predicted.

Additionally, in terms of the limitation of case studies in image restoration theory, Coombs  argued that closer scrutiny with insights should be taken before offering strategies to crisis managers as facts. To gain additional insights into the use of crisis responses, he pointed out many similar crises should be examined for patterns of strategy use and effect, and “a large number of cases could be coded and subjected to log-linear analysis to identify patterns.” (Coombs, 2006, p. 191-192)

The Cola Wars 
Coca-Cola and Pepsi's longstanding competition reached its peak when Coke and Pepsi placed advertisements in Nation's Restaurant News with unmistakable attacks from both sides.

Benoit analyses advertisements from both companies from 1990-1992 to address the persuasive strategies of Coke and Pepsi to determine recommendations for image restoration following an attack. He advises that companies should avoid making false claims, provide adequate support for claims, and develop themes throughout a campaign, and avoid arguments that might backfire.

External links
 William Benoit

References

Crisis
Mass media theories
Communication theory